Svante Gustav Adolf Kede (1877 in Stockholm – 1955 in Stockholm), was a Swedish artist and painter.

Svante Kede studied in Paris from 1904 to 1908. Some of his artist friends while studying in Paris were Erik Tryggelin, David Wallin, Otto Strandman, Svante Nilsson and Fritz Lindström. Fritz Lindström was already then a member of Rackstad colony artists, Rackengruppen, in Värmland in Sweden, where Gustaf Fjaestad was the leading artist.

He also spent some time in Tahiti in the 1920s. He made trips to Spain, Morocco and the Pacific Islands. Svante Kede has painted landscapes and figure motifs from Spain and Northern Africa, the mountains of Lapland and landscapes, and figure motifs from Tahiti.

Svante Kede is represented in Nationalmuseum in Stockholm, Moderna Museet i Stockholm and the art museums in Norrköping, Norrköpings Konstmuseum, Västerås, Västerås Konstmuseum and Karlskrona, Karlskrona Konstmuseum.

References

Sources
 Svante Kede in Konstnärslexikonett Amanda (Swedish)

External links
 Göteborgs Konsthall Exhibitions in Göteborgs Konsthall 1923–1933, Acke Hallgren, Svante Kede, Gösta Nordblad, January 9–28, 1928, Paintings and drawings.
Svante Kede in Findartinfo
Svante Kede in AskART
Oilpaintings by Svante Kede
Oilpainting "Tahiti", by Svante Kede
Oilpainting "Fjälllandskap med sjö", by Svante Kede
Oilpainting "Kasban i Rabat, Marocko", 35x49, by Svante Kede

19th-century Swedish painters
Swedish male painters
20th-century Swedish painters
1877 births
1955 deaths
19th-century Swedish male artists
20th-century Swedish male artists